The 47th Annual Grammy Awards were held on February 13, 2005, at the Staples Center in Los Angeles honoring the best in music for the recording of the year beginning from October 1, 2003, through September 30, 2004. They were hosted by Queen Latifah, and televised in the United States by CBS.  They recognized accomplishments by musicians from the previous year. Ray Charles, whom the event was dedicated in memory of, posthumously won five Grammy Awards while his album, Genius Loves Company, won a total of eight. Kanye West received the most nominations with ten, winning three. Usher received eight nominations and won three including Best Contemporary R&B Album for his diamond selling album Confessions. Britney Spears received her first Grammy of Best Dance Recording for her 2004 smash hit "Toxic".

Performers

Velvet Revolver, Tim McGraw, Alison Krauss, Norah Jones, Bono, Stevie Wonder, Brian Wilson, Billie Joe Armstrong, Alicia Keys and Steven Tyler performed "Across the Universe" in  a tribute to The Beatles.
The Black Eyed Peas, Gwen Stefani, Eve, Maroon 5, Los Lonely Boys and Franz Ferdinand performed a medley together.
 Usher performed with James Brown
 Kanye West performed "Jesus Walks".
 Alicia Keys performed with Jamie Foxx.
 Tim McGraw performed "Live Like You Were Dying".
 Melissa Etheridge, bald from chemotherapy for breast cancer, joined Joss Stone on stage for a tribute to Janis Joplin.
 U2
 Queen Latifah

Presenters

 Gary Sinise and Bonnie Raitt presented Album of the Year.
 Sheryl Crow and Lance Armstrong presented Record of the Year.
 Stevie Wonder and Norah Jones presented Song of the Year.
 Adam Sandler and Nelly presented Best Male R&B Vocal Performance.
 John Travolta, Christina Milian, and Steven Tyler presented Best Pop Performance by a Duo or Group with Vocal.
 Amy Lee, Alison Krauss and T Bone Burnett presented Best Country Album.
 Ricky Martin, Anthony Hamilton and Mario presented Best R&B Album.
 Lisa Marie Presley and John Mayer presented Best Rock Performance by a Duo or Group with Vocal.
 Penelope Cruz, Mark McGrath and Pharrell presented Best Rock Album.
 Kevin Bacon and Ludacris presented Best Rap Album.
 Tyra Banks and Hoobastank presented Best New Artist.

Winners and nominees

Bold type indicates the winner out of the list of nominees.

General
Record of the Year
 "Here We Go Again" – Ray Charles & Norah Jones
 John Burk, producer; Al Schmitt, Mark Fleming, & Terry Howard, engineers/mixers
 "Let's Get It Started" – The Black Eyed Peas
 Will.i.am, producer; Mark "Spike" Stent & Will.i.am, engineers/mixers
 "American Idiot" – Green Day
 Billie Joe Armstrong, Rob Cavallo, Mike Dirnt & Tré Cool, producers; Chris Lord-Alge & Doug McKean, engineers/mixers
 "Heaven" – Los Lonely Boys
 John Porter, producer; Steve Chadie & John Porter, engineers/mixers
 "Yeah!" – Usher featuring Lil Jon & Ludacris
 Jonathan "Lil Jon" Smith, producer; John Frye, Donnie Scantz, Jonathan "Lil Jon" Smith, The Trak Starz & Mark Vinten, engineers/mixers

Album of the Year
 Genius Loves Company – Ray Charles & Various Artists John Burk, Terry Howard, Don Mizell, Phil Ramone & Herbert Waltl, producers; Robert Fernandez, Mark Fleming, John Harris, Terry Howard, Pete Karam, Joel Moss, Seth Presant, Al Schmitt & Ed Thacker, engineers/mixers; Robert Hadley & Doug Sax, mastering engineersAmerican Idiot – Green Day
 Billie Joe Armstrong, Rob Cavallo, Mike Dirnt & Tré Cool, producers; Chris Lord-Alge & Doug McKean, engineers/mixers; Ted Jensen, mastering engineer
The Diary of Alicia Keys – Alicia Keys
 Kerry "Krucial" Brothers, Vidal Davis, Easy Mo Bee, Andre Harris, Alicia Keys, Kumasi, Timbaland, Kanye West & Dwayne "D. Wigg" Wiggins, producers; Tony Black, Kerry "Krucial" Brothers, Vincent Dilorenzo, Russ Elevado, Manny Marroquin, Walter Millsap III, Ann Mincieli & Pat Viala, engineers/mixers; Herb Powers, Jr., mastering engineer
Confessions – Usher
 Bobby Ross Avila, Valdez Brantley, Bryan-Michael Cox, Vidal Davis, Destro Music, Jermaine Dupri, Andre Harris, Rich Harrison, IZ, Jimmy Jam, Just Blaze, James Lackey, Terry Lewis, Juan Johnny Najera, Pro J, Usher Raymond, Jonathan "Lil Jon" Smith, Aaron Spears, Arthur Strong, Thicke & James "Big Jim" Wright, producers; Ian Cross, Kevin "KD" Davis, Vidal Davis, Vince DeLorenzo, Jermaine Dupri, Blake Eisman, Brian Frye, John Frye, Serban Ghenea, Andre Harris, John Horesco IV, Ken Lewis, Matt Marrin, Manny Marroquin, Tony Maserati, Pro J, Donnie Scantz, Jon Smeltz, Jonathan "Lil Jon" Smith, Phil Tan, The Trak Starz, Mark Vinten & Ryan West, engineers/mixers; Herb Powers, mastering engineer
The College Dropout – Kanye West
 Kanye West, Kyambo “Hip Hop” Joshua, Brian “All Day” Miller, Evidence & Porse, producers; Eugene A. Toale, Andrew Dawson, Anthony Kilhoffer, Tatsuya Sato, Rich Balmer, Brent Kolatalo, Keith Slattery, Jacob Andrew, Gimel “Guru” Keaton, Jacelyn Parry, Michael Eleopoulos, Dave Dar, Jason Rauhoff, Marc Fuller, Carlisle Young, Francis Graham, Manny Marroquin, Jared Lopez, Mike Dean & Ken Lewis, engineers/mixers; Eddy Schreyer, mastering engineerSong of the Year "Daughters" John Mayer, songwriter (John Mayer) "If I Ain't Got You"
 Alicia Keys, songwriter (Alicia Keys)
 "Jesus Walks"
 C. Smith & Kanye West, songwriters (Kanye West)
 "Live Like You Were Dying"
 Tim Nichols & Craig Wiseman, songwriters (Tim McGraw)
 "The Reason" 
 Daniel Estrin & Douglas Robb, songwriters (Hoobastank)Best New ArtistMaroon 5Los Lonely Boys
Joss Stone
Kanye West
Gretchen Wilson

PopBest Female Pop Vocal Performance"Sunrise" – Norah Jones"The First Cut Is the Deepest" – Sheryl Crow
"Oceania" – Björk
"What You Waiting For?" – Gwen Stefani
"You Had Me" – Joss StoneBest Male Pop Vocal Performance"Daughters" – John Mayer"Let's Misbehave" – Elvis Costello
"You Raise Me Up" – Josh Groban
"Cinnamon Girl" – Prince
"Love's Divine" – SealBest Pop Performance by a Duo or Group with Vocal"Heaven" – Los Lonely Boys"My Immortal" – Evanescence
"The Reason" – Hoobastank
"She Will Be Loved" – Maroon 5
"It's My Life" – No DoubtBest Pop Collaboration with Vocals"Here We Go Again" – Ray Charles & Norah Jones"Redemption Song" – Johnny Cash & Joe Strummer
"Sorry Seems to Be the Hardest Word" – Ray Charles & Elton John
"Something" – Paul McCartney & Eric Clapton
"Moon River" – Stevie Wonder & Take 6Best Pop Instrumental Performance"11th Commandment" – Ben Harper"Chasing Shadows" – Herb Alpert, Russ Freeman, James Genus, Gene Lake & Jason Miles
"Take You Out" – George Benson
"Song F" – Bruce Hornsby
"Rat Pack Boogie" – Brian SetzerBest Pop Instrumental AlbumHenry Mancini: Pink Guitar – Various Artists; James Jensen, producerPure – Boney James
Saxophonic – Dave Koz
Forever, for Always, for Luther – Various Artists; Bud Harner & Rex Rideout, producers
EP 2003: Music for the Epicurean Harkener – Mason WilliamsBest Pop Vocal AlbumGenius Loves Company – Ray Charles & Various ArtistsFeels Like Home – Norah Jones
Afterglow – Sarah McLachlan
Mind Body & Soul – Joss Stone
Brian Wilson Presents Smile – Brian Wilson

DanceBest Dance Recording"Toxic" – Britney SpearsAvant & Bloodshy, producers; Niklas Flyckt, mixer"Good Luck" – Basement Jaxx featuring Lisa Kekaula
Basement Jaxx, producers; Basement Jaxx, mixers
"Get Yourself High" – The Chemical Brothers
The Chemical Brothers, producers; The Chemical Brothers, mixers
"Slow" – Kylie Minogue
Dan Carey & Emilíana Torrini, producers; Mr. Dan, mixer
"Comfortably Numb" – Scissor Sisters
Scissor Sisters, producers; Neil Harris & Scissor Sisters, mixersBest Electronic/Dance AlbumKish Kash – Basement JaxxLegion of Boom – The Crystal Method
Creamfields – Paul Oakenfold
Always Outnumbered, Never Outgunned – The Prodigy
Reflections – Paul van Dyk

Traditional PopBest Traditional Pop Vocal AlbumStardust: The Great American Songbook, Volume III – Rod Stewart
Only You – Harry Connick Jr.
Count Your Blessings – Barbara Cook
Ultimate Mancini – Monica Mancini
Just for a Thrill – Ronnie Milsap

Rock
Best Solo Rock Vocal Performance
"Code of Silence" – Bruce Springsteen
"Wonderwall" – Ryan Adams
"The Revolution Starts Now" – Steve Earle
"Breathe" – Melissa Etheridge
"Metropolitan Gride" – Tom Waits

Best Rock Performance by a Duo or Group with Vocal
"Vertigo" – U2
"Monkey to Man" – Elvis Costello & The Imposters
"Take Me Out" – Franz Ferdinand
"American Idiot" – Green Day
"Somebody Told Me" – The Killers

Best Hard Rock Performance
 "Slither" – Velvet Revolver
 "Megalomaniac" – Incubus
 "Some Kind Of Monster" – Metallica
 "Feelin' Way Too Damn Good" – Nickelback
 "Duality" – Slipknot

Best Metal Performance
 "Whiplash" – Motörhead
 "Nymphetamine" – Cradle of Filth
 "Live for This" – Hatebreed
 "The End Of Heartache" – Killswitch Engage
 "Vermilion" – Slipknot

Best Rock Instrumental Performance
 "Mrs. O'Leary's Cow" – Brian Wilson
 "Instrumental Illness" – The Allman Brothers Band
 "Onda" – Los Lonely Boys
 "O Baterista" – Rush
 "Whispering a Prayer" – Steve Vai

Best Rock Song
 "Vertigo"
 Bono, Adam Clayton, The Edge & Larry Mullen, songwriters (U2)
 "American Idiot"
 Billie Joe Armstrong, Mike Dirnt & Tré Cool, songwriters (Green Day)
 "Fall To Pieces"
 Duff, Dave Kushner, Slash, Matt Sorum & Scott Weiland, songwriters (Velvet Revolver)
 "Float On"
 Isaac Brock, Dann Gallucci, Eric Judy & Benjamin Weikel, songwriters (Modest Mouse)
 "Somebody Told Me"
 Brandon Flowers, Dave Keuning, Mark Stoermer & Ronnie Vannucci, songwriters (The Killers)

Best Rock Album
 American Idiot – Green Day The Delivery Man – Elvis Costello & The Imposters
 The Reason – Hoobastank
 Hot Fuss – The Killers
 Contraband – Velvet Revolver

AlternativeBest Alternative Music AlbumA Ghost Is Born – Wilco
Medúlla – Björk
Franz Ferdinand – Franz Ferdinand
Uh Huh Her – PJ Harvey
Good News for People Who Love Bad News– Modest Mouse

Blues
 Best Contemporary Blues Album
 Keb' Mo' for Keep It Simple

Classical
Best Classical Album
"Adams: On The Transmigration Of Souls" – Lorin Maazel, conductor; John Adams & Lawrence L. Rock, producers

Best Orchestral Performance
"Adams: On The Transmigration Of Souls" – Lorin Maazel, conductor; John Adams & Lawrence L. Rock, producers

Best Opera Recording
"Mozart: Le Nozze Di Figaro" – René Jacobs, conductor; Martin Sauer, producer. Angelika Kirchschlager, Lorenzo Regazzo, Patrizia Ciofi, Simon Keenlyside & Véronique Gens, soloists; Reiner Kühl & Sebastian Roth, engineers/mixers

Best Choral Performance
"Berlioz: Requiem" – Norman Mackenzie, choir director; Robert Spano, conductor; Jack Renner & Michael J. Bishop, engineers/mixers; Elaine L. Martone, producer

Best Instrumental Soloist(s) Performance (with orchestra)
"Previn: Violin Concerto Anne-Sophie/Bernstein: Serenade" – André Previn, conductor; Anne-Sophie Mutter, soloist

Best Instrumental Soloist Performance (without orchestra)
"Aire Latino" – David Russell

Best Chamber Music Performance
"Prokofiev (Arr. Pletnev): Cinderella – Suite For Two Pianos/Ravel: Ma Mère L'Oye" – Martha Argerich & Mikhail Pletnev, soloists

Best Small Ensemble Performance (with or without conductor)
"Carlos Chávez – Complete Chamber Music, Vol. 2" – Southwest Chamber Music, artist; Jeff Von Der Schmidt, conductor

Best Classical Vocal Performance
"Ives: Songs (The Things Our Fathers Loved; The Housatonic At Stockbridge, Etc.)" – Susan Graham

Best Classical Contemporary Composition
"Adams: On The Transmigration Of Souls" – John Adams

Best Classical Crossover Album
"LAGQ's Guitar Heroes" – Los Angeles Guitar Quartet (John Dearman, William Kanengiser, Scott Tennant, Andrew York)

Country
Best Female Country Vocal Performance
"Redneck Woman" – Gretchen Wilson

Best Male Country Vocal Performance
"Live Like You Were Dying" – Tim McGraw

Best Country Performance by a Duo or Group with Vocal
"Top of the World" (Live) – Dixie Chicks

Best Country Collaboration with Vocals
"Portland, Oregon" – Loretta Lynn & Jack White

Best Country Instrumental Performance
Nitty Gritty Dirt Band (featuring Earl Scruggs, Randy Scruggs, Vassar Clements & Jerry Douglas) for "Earl's Breakdown

Best Country Song
"Live Like You Were Dying" – Tim McGraw

Best Country Album
Van Lear Rose – Loretta Lynn

Best Bluegrass Album
Brand New Strings – Ricky Skaggs & Kentucky Thunder

Gospel
Best Gospel Performance
"Heaven Help Us All" – Ray Charles & Gladys Knight

Best Pop/Contemporary Gospel Album
All Things New – Steven Curtis Chapman

Best Rock Gospel Album
Wire – Third Day

Best Traditional Soul Gospel Album
There Will Be a Light – Ben Harper & the Blind Boys of Alabama

Best Contemporary Soul Gospel Album
Nothing Without You – Smokie Norful

Best Southern, Country or Bluegrass Gospel Album
Worship & Faith – Randy Travis

Best Gospel Choir or Chorus Album
Live ... This is Your House – The Brooklyn Tabernacle Choir

Jazz
Best Jazz Instrumental Solo
"Speak Like a Child" – Herbie Hancock in Harvey Mason's With All My Heart

Best Jazz Instrumental Album, Individual or Group
Illuminations – McCoy Tyner with Gary Bartz, Terence Blanchard, Christian McBride and Lewis Nash

Best Large Jazz Ensemble Album
Concert in the Garden – The Maria Schneider Orchestra

Best Jazz Vocal Album
R.S.V.P. (Rare Songs, Very Personal)" – Nancy Wilson

Best Contemporary Jazz AlbumUnspeakable – Bill Frisell

Best Latin Jazz AlbumLand of the Sun – Charlie Haden

Latin
Best Latin Pop AlbumAmar Sin Mentiras – Marc AnthonySinverguenza – Bacilos
Pau-Latina – Paulina Rubio
MTV Unplugged – Diego Torres
El Rock de Mi Pueblo – Carlos Vives

Best Traditional Tropical Latin Album
¡Ahora Si! – Israel "Cachao" López

Best Mexican/Mexican-American Album
Intimamente – Intocable

Best Latin Rock/Alternative Album
Street Signs – Ozomatli

Best Tejano Album
Polkas, Gritos y Accordeones – David Lee Garza, Joel Guzman & Sunny Sauceda

Best Salsa/Merengue Album
Across 110th Street – The Spanish Harlem Orchestra (featuring Rubén Blades)

New Age
Best New Age AlbumReturning – Will AckermanAtlantis: A Symphonic Journey – David ArkenstoneTwo Horizons – Moya BrennanPiano – Peter KaterAmerican River – Jonathan Elias

Polka
Best Polka AlbumLet's Kiss: 25th Anniversary Album – Brave Combo

R&B
Best Female R&B Vocal Performance
"If I Ain't Got You" – Alicia Keys
"I Want You" – Janet Jackson
"I'm Still in Love" – Teena Marie
"Whatever" – Jill Scott
"U-Haul" – Angie Stone

Best Male R&B Vocal Performance
"Call My Name" – Prince 
"Charlene" – Anthony Hamilton
"Happy People" – R. Kelly
"What We Do Here" – Brian McKnight
"Burn – Usher

Best R&B Performance by a Duo or Group with Vocals
"My Boo" – Usher & Alicia Keys
Destiny's Child for "Lose My Breath"
Floetry for "Say Yes"
Alicia Keys featuring Tony! Toni! Toné! for "Diary"
Earth, Wind & Fire & Raphael Saadiq for "Show Me the Way"

Best Traditional R&B Vocal Performance
"Musicology" – Prince

Best Urban/Alternative Performance
"Cross My Mind" – Jill Scott

Best R&B Song
"You Don't Know My Name" – Alicia Keys

Best R&B AlbumThe Diary of Alicia Keys – Alicia Keys

Best Contemporary R&B AlbumConfessions – Usher

Rap
Best Rap Solo Performance
"99 Problems" – Jay-Z
"On Fire" – Lloyd Banks
"Just Lose It" – Eminem
"Overnight Celebrity" – Twista
"Through the Wire" – Kanye West

Best Rap Performance by a Duo or Group
"Let's Get It Started" – The Black Eyed Peas
"Ch-Check It Out" – Beastie Boys
"Don't Say Nuthing'" – The Roots
"Drop It Like It's Hot" – Snoop Dogg & Pharrell
"Lean Back" – Terror Squad

Best Rap/Sung Collaboration
"Yeah!" – Usher featuring Lil Jon & Ludacris
"Why" – Jadakiss featuring Anthony Hamilton
"Dip It Low" – Christina Milian featuring Fabolous
"Slow Jamz" – Twista featuring Kanye West & Jamie Foxx
"All Falls Down" – Kanye West featuring Syleena Johnson

Best Rap Song
 "Jesus Walks"
 Miri Ben-Ari, C. Smith & Kanye West, songwriters (Kanye West)
 "Drop It Like It's Hot"
 Calvin Broadus, Chad Hugo, S. Thomas & Pharrell Williams, songwriters (Snoop Dogg & Pharrell)
 "Hey Mama"
 Will Adams & Anthony Henry, songwriters (The Black Eyed Peas)
 "Let's Get It Started"
 Will Adams, Mike Fratantuno, Jaime Gomez, George Pajon, Jr., Allan Pineda & Terence Yoshiaki, songwriters (The Black Eyed Peas)
 "99 Problems"
 Shawn Carter & Rick Rubin, songwriters (Jay-Z)

Best Rap AlbumThe College Dropout – Kanye WestTo the 5 Boroughs – Beastie BoysThe Black Album – Jay-ZThe Definition – LL Cool JSuit – Nelly

Reggae
Best Reggae Album'True Love – Toots & the Maytals'Black Magic – Jimmy CliffThe Dub Revolutionaries – Sly and RobbieAfrican Holocaust – Steel PulseDef Jamaica – Various Artists

World
Best Traditional World Music AlbumRaise Your Spirit Higher – Ladysmith Black Mambazo

Best Contemporary World Music AlbumEgypt – Youssou N'Dour

Spoken
Best Spoken Word AlbumMy Life – Bill Clinton

Music video
Best Short Form Music Video
"Vertigo" – Alex and Martin (video directors) & U2

Best Long Form Music VideoConcert for George – Ray Cooper, Olivia Harrison, Jon Kamen (video producers), David Leland (video director) & Various Artists

Packaging and notes
Best Recording PackageA Ghost Is BornPeter Buchanan-Smith & Dan Nadel (art directors) (Wilco)

Best Boxed or Special Limited Edition Package
Stefan Sagmeister (art director) for Once in a Lifetime performed by Talking Heads

Best Album Notes
Loren Schoenberg (notes writer) for "The Complete Columbia Recordings of Woody Herman and His Orchestra & Woodchoppers (1945–1947)"

Production and engineering
Best Engineered Album, Non-Classical
Robert Fernandez, John Harris, Terry Howard, Pete Karam, Joel Moss, Seth Presant, Al Schmitt & Ed Thacker (engineers) for Genius Loves Company, performed by Ray Charles & Various Artists

Best Engineered Album, Classical
Jack Renner (engineer) for Higdon: City Scape; Concerto for Orchestra, performed by Robert Spano

Best Remixed Recording, Non-Classical
Jacques Lu Cont (remixer) for "It's My Life (Jacques Lu Cont's Thin White Duke Mix)", performed by No Doubt

Producer of the Year, Non-Classical
John Shanks

Producer of the Year, Classical
David Frost

Surround sound
Best Surround Sound Album
Al Schmitt (surround mix engineer), Robert Hadley & Doug Sax (surround mastering) for Genius Loves Company performed by Ray Charles & Various Artists

Special merit awards

Grammy Hall of Fame Award
"Alexander's Ragtime Band" (Victor, 1911) performed by Arthur Collins & Byron Harlan
"All of Me" (Columbia, 1932) performed by Louis Armstrong & His Orchestra
"America the Beautiful" (ABC/TRC, 1972) performed by Ray Charles
"Brother, Can You Spare a Dime?" (Brunswick, 1932) performed by Bing Crosby
"Bye Bye Blackbird" (Victor, 1926) performed by Gene Austin
"California, Here I Come" (Brunswick, 1924) performed by Al Jolson with the Isham Jones Orchestra
"Embraceable You" (Commodore, 1944) performed by Billie Holiday
"Lester Leaps In" (Vocalion, 1939) performed by Count Basie's Kansas City 7
"Let It Bleed" (London, 1969) performed by The Rolling Stones
"Love Me or Leave Me" (Columbia, 1928) performed by Ruth Etting
"Lullaby of Broadway" (Brunswick, 1935) performed by Dick PowellMeet Me In St. Louis (soundtrack) (Decca, 1944) performed by Judy Garland
"No Woman No Cry" (Island, 1974) performed by Bob Marley
"One For My Baby" (Capitol, 1958) performed by Frank Sinatra
"Peter Gunn" (RCA, 1959) performed by Henry Mancini
"Puttin' on the Ritz" (Brunswick, 1930) performed by Harry Richman with Earl Burtnett & His Los Angeles Biltmore Hotel Orchestra
"Thanks for the Memory" (Decca, 1938) performed by Bob Hope & Shirley Ross
"They Can't Take That Away From Me" (Brunswick, 1937) performed by Fred Astaire with Johnny Green & His Orchestra
"Vaya Con Dios (May God Be With You)" (Capitol, 1953) performed by Les Paul & Mary Ford
"The Very Thought of You" (Victor, 1934) performed by Ray Noble & His Orchestra

Grammy Lifetime Achievement Award

John "Bonzo" Bonham
Eddy Arnold
Art Blakey
The Carter Family
Morton Gould
Janis Joplin
Robert Plant
Jerry Lee Lewis 
Jelly Roll Morton 
Pinetop Perkins,
The Staple Singers

MusiCares Person of the Year

Brian Wilson

Grammy Trustees Award

Hoagy Carmichael
Don Cornelius
Alfred Lion
Billy Taylor

 In Memoriam 
Estelle Axton, Danny Sugarman, Bruce Palmer, Johnny Ramone, Darrell "Dimebag" Abbott, Jim Capaldi, Artie Shaw, Barney Kessel, Elvin Jones, Illinois Jacquet, Michel Colombier, Alvino Rey, Ol' Dirty Bastard, Jan Berry, Terry Melcher, Laura Branigan, Cornelius Bumpus, Spencer Dryden, Elmer Bernstein, David Raksin, Jerry Goldsmith, Vaughn Meader, Rodney Dangerfield, Scott Muni, Johnny Carson, Skeeter Davis, Bill Lowery, Hank Garland, Arnold "Gatemouth" Moore, Ernie Ball, Tom Capone, Isidro Lopez, Robert Merrill, Renata Tebaldi, Fred Ebb, Cy Coleman, Paul Atkinson, Artie Mogull, Carole Fields Arnold, Rick James, Freddie Perren, Syreeta Wright and Ray Charles.

Trivia
Ray Charles five Grammy wins is the record for most posthumous Grammy Awards won in one night. He is the first artist to win a posthumous Album of the Year Grammy since John Lennon in 1982.
Upon winning Album of the Year as one of the engineers for Ray Charles' Genius Loves Company, Al Schmitt became the first and only person to have won both the Grammy for Album of the Year and the Latin Grammy for Album of the Year. In 2000 he won the Latin Grammy for Album of the Year for engineering Luis Miguel's Amarte Es Un Placer''.

References

 047
2005 in American music
2005 in California
2005 music awards
2005 in Los Angeles
Grammy
February 2005 events in the United States